Josse Ruth (1896 – date of death unknown) was a Belgian athlete. Ruth competed for his native country at the 1924 Summer Olympics in pentathlon and decathlon.

Achievements

See also
Belgium at the 1924 Summer Olympics

References

External links
 
 

1896 births
Year of death missing
Belgian pentathletes
Belgian decathletes
Athletes (track and field) at the 1924 Summer Olympics
Olympic decathletes
Olympic athletes of Belgium